The Ward House in Syracuse, New York was designed in 1914 by architect Ward Wellington Ward.  It was one of two speculative properties that Ward and his wife arranged to have built.  Along with others of his works, it was listed on the National Register of Historic Places in 1997.

References

Houses in Syracuse, New York
National Register of Historic Places in Syracuse, New York
Houses on the National Register of Historic Places in New York (state)
Houses completed in 1914